Cenchreae or Kenchreai was a city of the ancient Troad. According to Stephanus of Byzantium, the city was that "in which Homer lived while he was inquiring of the things that concerned the Trees.". Another tradition, of no more value, makes it the birthplace of Homer.

Its site is located near modern Kayalı Dağ.

References

Populated places in ancient Troad
Former populated places in Turkey